Nicopolis was an ancient city and archbishopric in Epirus, now in continental Greece.

Nicopolis or Nikopolis (Greek: "city of victory") may also refer to:

In Europe 
 Nicopolis (theme), a Byzantine theme (military province) encompassing western Greece
 Nicopolis ad Istrum, a city in Moesia, also known as Nicopolis ad Iaternum, now Stari-Nicup in northern Bulgaria
 Nicopolis ad Nestum, city in Thrace, ruins at modern Garmen in southern Bulgaria
 Nikopol, Bulgaria

In Africa
 Nicopolis, a city on Egypt's Mediterranean coast, about five miles east of Alexandria

In Asia 
 Anatolia (Turkey) 
 Nicopolis (Armenia), an ancient Roman colony, now Koyulhisar in Turkey
 Nicopolis (Bithynia), an ancient town of Bithynia in northwestern Anatolia
 Nicopolis (Cilicia), an ancient town of Cilicia in southeastern Anatolia
 Nicopolis, a city in Asia Minor, now Afyonkarahisar 

 Holy Land
 Emmaus Nicopolis, a Roman name for the city of Emmaus as refounded in 221 AD (in present-day Israel), Arabic ‘Amwās

See also 
 Battle of Nicopolis
 Nikopoli, Thessaloniki
 Nikopol (disambiguation)
 Nikopsis